Bouchercon is an annual convention of creators and devotees of mystery and detective fiction. It is named in honour of writer, reviewer, and editor Anthony Boucher; also the inspiration for the Anthony Awards, which have been issued at the convention since 1986. This page details Bouchercon XXI and the 5th Anthony Awards ceremony.

Bouchercon
The convention was held in London, England on September 21, 1990; running until the 23rd. The event was chaired by Marion & Robin Richmond, owners of Scottish book-store Ming Books, known for having the largest stock of crime fiction in the UK.

Special Guests
Lifetime Achievement award — Michael Gilbert
Guest of Honor — P.D. James
Fan Guest of Honor — Robert Adey
Toastmaster — Sue Grafton

Anthony Awards
The following list details the awards distributed at the fifth annual Anthony Awards ceremony.

Novel award
Winner:
Sarah Caudwell, The Sirens Sang of Murder

Shortlist:
Susan Dunlap, Pious Deception
Carolyn G. Hart, A Little Class On Murder
Margaret Maron, Corpus Christmas

First novel award
Winner:
Karen Kijewski, Katwalk

Shortlist:
Jill Churchill, Grime and Punishment
Melodie Johnson Howe, The Mother Shadow
Edith Skom, The Mark Twain Murders
Susan Wolfe, The Last Billable Hour

Paperback original award
Winner:
Carolyn G. Hart,  Honeymoon with Murder

Shortlist:
Malacai Black, On My Honor
D.R. Meredith, Murder By Deception
Keith Peterson, Rough Justice
Deborah Valentine, A Collector of Photographs

Short story award
Winner:
Nancy Pickard, "Afraid all the Time", from Sisters in Crime

Shortlist:
Susan Dunlap, "No Safety", from Sisters in Crime
Sharyn McCrumb, "A Wee Doch and Doris", from Mistletoe Mysteries
Shelly Singer, "A Terrible Thing", from Sisters in Crime

Movie award
Winner:
Crimes and Misdemeanors

Shortlist:

No shortlist released

Television series award
Winner:
Inspector Morse

Shortlist:

No shortlist released

References

Anthony Awards
21
1990 in England